Juan Miguel Feliz Bulnes (born May 28, 1937 in Ribadesella) is a Spanish sprint canoer who competed in the early 1960s. He was eliminated in the semifinals of the K-2 1000 m event at the 1960 Summer Olympics in Rome.

References
 Sports-reference.com profile

1937 births
Canoeists at the 1960 Summer Olympics
Living people
Olympic canoeists of Spain
Spanish male canoeists
People from Ribadesella